Yuriy Dmytrovych Hunko (born February 28, 1972), also known as Yuri Gunko, is a former Ukrainian professional ice hockey player. He was drafted by the St. Louis Blues in the 10th round, 230th overall in the 1992 NHL Entry Draft.

Career
Gunko began his career with ShVSM Kyiv in 1988. He stayed with SHVSM until 1990, when he joined Sokil Kyiv, and played with them until 1995. Gunko then played four seasons for Ak Bars Kazan, before a one-year stop-over in the DEL with the Hannover Scorpions, before returning to Kazan in 2000. He then played for CSKA Moscow for one season, before re-joining Sokil Kyiv for four years, from 2002-2006. After playing one year with both HKm Zvolen and HK ATEK Kyiv, he re-joined Sokil Kyiv for the third time.

Achievements

International
Silver medal at the 1990 IIHF European U18 Championship

Career statistics

Regular season and playoffs

International

References

1972 births
Living people
Ak Bars Kazan players
Hannover Scorpions players
Ice hockey players at the 2002 Winter Olympics
Olympic ice hockey players of Ukraine
Sokil Kyiv players
Soviet ice hockey defencemen
Sportspeople from Kyiv
St. Louis Blues draft picks
Ukrainian ice hockey defencemen